The 2005 Atlanta Falcons season was the franchise’s 40th in the National Football League (NFL). It began with the team trying to defend their NFC South division title and 11–5 record in 2004. The Falcons started 6–2, but injuries on defense caused them to finish the second half 2–6 to finish the season 8–8. Bright spots included the Falcons ending their Monday Night Football jinx by going 3–0, and on Thursday, November 24, the Falcons played on Thanksgiving Day for the first time in franchise history with a 27–7 victory over the Detroit Lions. On the next-to-last game of the regular season, the Falcons were eliminated from postseason contention with a 27–24 overtime loss against the Tampa Bay Buccaneers. The Falcons failed to improve over their 11–5 season, therefore finishing with a .500 record and once again failed to attain back-to-back winning seasons.

Offseason

NFL Draft

Personnel

Staff

Roster

Schedule

Preseason

Regular season

Game summaries

Week 1 vs Eagles

Standings

Images

References

External links
 2005 Atlanta Falcons at Pro-Football-Reference.com

Atlanta
Atlanta Falcons seasons
Atlanta